Puttenham is a village and former civil parish, now in the parish of Tring Rural, in the Dacorum district, in north west Hertfordshire, England. In 1961 the parish had a population of 107. On 1 April 1964 the parish was abolished and merged with Tring Rural.

It was recorded as ‘Puteham’ in the Domesday Book.

Puttenham is one of the 51 Thankful Villages in England and Wales that suffered no fatalities during the Great War of 1914 to 1918.

References

External links

Villages in Hertfordshire
Former civil parishes in Hertfordshire
Dacorum